Ali Saidi-Sief (born March 15, 1978) is an Algerian Olympic runner. His specialty is the 1500 m race, but he took a silver medal in the 2000 Summer Olympics for the 5000 m, losing the gold to Ethiopian athlete Million Wolde.

Saidi-Sief received a two-year suspension from the International Association of Athletics Federations after failing a urine test at the 2001 World Championships in Athletics in Edmonton, Alberta, Canada by testing positive for nandrolone, a banned performance-enhancing steroid. A second expert examination at a laboratory in Cologne showed that a supplement he had been taking (Peruvat) contained nandrolone, which was not in the labelled ingredients. This did not affect his doping ban, as the rules apply strict athlete liability, but he vowed to seek compensation from the manufacturer.

See also
 List of doping cases in athletics

References

External links
 

1978 births
Living people
Sportspeople from Constantine, Algeria
Algerian male middle-distance runners
Algerian male long-distance runners
Olympic athletes of Algeria
Olympic silver medalists for Algeria
Athletes (track and field) at the 2000 Summer Olympics
Athletes (track and field) at the 2004 Summer Olympics
Athletes (track and field) at the 2008 Summer Olympics
Medalists at the 2000 Summer Olympics
World Athletics Championships athletes for Algeria
Algerian sportspeople in doping cases
Doping cases in athletics
Olympic silver medalists in athletics (track and field)
Mediterranean Games gold medalists for Algeria
Athletes (track and field) at the 2005 Mediterranean Games
Athletes stripped of World Athletics Championships medals
Mediterranean Games medalists in athletics
21st-century Algerian people
20th-century Algerian people